The Timation satellites were conceived, developed, and launched by the United States Naval Research Laboratory in Washington, D.C. beginning in 1964. The concept of Timation was to broadcast an accurate time reference for use as a ranging signal to receivers on the ground. On 31 May 1967, the Timation-1 satellite was launched. This was followed by the Timation-2 satellite launch in 1969. The results of this program and Air Force Project 621B formed the basis for the Global Positioning System (GPS). The Navy's contribution to the GPS program continued to be focused on ever more accurate clocks.

History 
There is a historical connection between accurate time keeping, navigation, and the Navy. In 1714, the British government passed the Longitude Act (see longitude prize) to create an incentive to solve the problem of navigation at sea. The solution, developed by John Harrison, was an accurate clock which could compare local time to Greenwich, England time. To this day, Coordinated Universal Time (UTC), the successor of Greenwich Mean Time (GMT), is the reference time for the planet, and in the United States, the official time for the Department of Defense (DoD) is kept by the United States Navy at the U.S. Naval Observatory in Washington, D.C. This is kept in synchronization with the official civilian time reference maintained by National Institute of Standards and Technology (NIST) and contributes to the International Atomic Time.

See also 

 Time signal
 Global Positioning System (GPS)

References

External links 
 Timation Satellite Program (navy.mil) 
 Who invented the Global Positioning System? (thespacereview.com)
 Range navigation using the Timation II satellite

Navigation satellite constellations
Satellites orbiting Earth
Satellite navigation
1964 introductions